Nollywood is a term referring to cinema from the region of the Gulf of Guinea and its diaspora populations.

Nollywood may also refer to:

 Cinema of Nigeria, the original meaning of Nollywood
 Nollywood TV, a French-language TV channel of France featuring Nigerian film
 Nollywood Movies, an English-language British TV channel featuring Nigerian film

See also

 New Nollywood
 Cinema of Ghana, included in the extended meaning of Nollywood
 
 Hollywood (disambiguation)

Disambig-Class film articles